The list below outlines the distribution of the nationalities of China among provinces and province-level entities of the People's Republic of China (P.R.C.) according to the census of 2000. The provinces and province-level entities are listed by region. The classification of ethnic groups follows the official classification of the PRC.

Some ethnic groups, for instance, Mosuo people, although classified as Nakhi, do not regard themselves as part of any of the 56 groups identified by the PRC government. Some scholars made hypothesis that they are descendants of Mongols.

Excluded from this list is the Republic of China, which administers Taiwan and a fraction of Fujian Provinces. Please refer to Demographics of Taiwan for more information. The two special administrative regions (S.A.R.) of the P.R.C., namely Hong Kong and Macau, are not part of mainland China are also excluded. Please refer to Demographics of Hong Kong and Demographics of Macau.

Autonomous regions are marked with an asterisk (*).

Northern

Northeast

Eastern

Central-Southern

Southwest

Northwest

See also
Autonomous regions of China
List of ethnic groups in China
Taiwanese indigenous peoples

References
National Bureau of Statistics

 
Ethnic group
Ethnic group